Tashkurghan, Turkic for stone tower

Geography
 Khulm, formerly known as Tashkurgan or Tash-Kurgan, is a town in northern Afghanistan.
 Tashkurgan Town - official spelling: Taxkorgan, is a Tajik town in western Xinjiang, China. It is also the seat of Taxkorgan Tajik Autonomous County.